Grapholita caecana is a moth belonging to the family Tortricidae, first described by F. Schläger in 1847 and native to Eurasia.

References

Grapholitini
Moths described in 1847